The 2017 Campeonato Brasiliense was the 42nd edition of the Campeonato Brasiliense, the main division of soccer of the Federal District (Brazil). The competition, which was organized by the Brasiliense Football Federation, was played between January 30 and May 7 by twelve teams from DF, Goiás and Minas Gerais. The championship awarded two places for the 2018 Copa do Brasil and the 2018 Copa Verde, as well as two places for the 2018 Campeonato Brasileiro Série D.

Regulation 
The championship was played in four stages: qualifying round, quarter finals, semifinals and final. In the first phase, the twelve teams played each other in first leg games, totaling eleven rounds. The eight teams with the most points scored in the first round advanced to the quarter-finals, while the last two teams were relegated to the second division in 2018. From then on, teams faced a knockout system until the championship game of 2017.

The champion and runner-up won places in two national championships: the 2018 Brasileirão Série D (unless one of them is already playing in Série A, Série B, or Série C, or already assured qualification to Série D) and the 2018 Copa do Brasil, and the teams in third and fourth place won places in the 2018 Copa Verde.

Tiebreaker 
If there was a tie in the number of points won between two or more teams in the qualifying round, the following tiebreaker criteria were applied successively:
 Highest number of wins
 Highest goal difference
 Highest number of goals for
 Lowest number of red cards
 Smallest number of yellow cards

In the playoffs of the knockout stages, a draw will occur after the 180 minutes of play, the match will be defined by means of penalties of maximum penalties.

Participating teams

First phase

Classification

Final phase 

Brasiliense and Ceilândia qualify for 2018 Campeonato Brasileiro Série D.Brasiliense and Ceilândia qualify for 2018 Copa do Brasil.Brasiliense and Ceilândia qualify for 2018 Copa Verde.

References 

2017 in Brazilian football
Campeonato Brasiliense